Schotia is a genus of flowering plants in the legume family, Fabaceae. It belongs to the subfamily Detarioideae. It occurs in southern Africa. The genus was named for Richard van der Schot by Jacquin who was the director of the Imperial Gardens at Schönbrunn Palace, Vienna. Van der Schot was his head gardener.

Species
 Schotia afra
 Schotia brachypetala
 Schotia capitata
 Schotia latifolia

Uses
This tree can be used as a shade and ornamental tree. The leaves are browsed by stock. The seeds are edible either green, or mature. They can be used as a meal if roasted and ground. Traditionally the trees bark have been used in tanning, and the tree is suitable to grow as a bonsai species.

References

Alice Aubrey, Walter Sisulu National Botanical Garden Schotia latifolia

External links
 

Detarioideae
Fabaceae genera